Mater Dei school is a Christian Minority school for girls situated at Tilak Lane, New Delhi.

History
The school was established by Franciscan Missionaries of Mary in 1956. It is a CBSE affiliated school. The school is operated by the society of Franciscan Sisters Of Mary, New Delhi. Sr. Stella Joseph is the Principal of the school. The motto of the school is "to love through truth". The school caters classes from Nursery to 12th standard.

See also 
 List of Christian schools in India
Education in India
List of schools in India
List of schools in Delhi affiliated with CBSE

References

External links 
 Central Board of Secondary Education

Franciscan high schools
Catholic secondary schools in India
Primary schools in India
Private schools in Delhi
Christian schools in Delhi
Girls' schools in Delhi
High schools and secondary schools in Delhi
Educational institutions established in 1956
1956 establishments in Delhi